The Garavogue or Garvoge ( is a river in County Sligo, northwest Ireland, known historically as the Sligeach or Sligo River.

Etymology
Garavogue is not the original name of the river, which was earlier and for centuries called the Sligeach, a name meaning abounding in shells, by the native local population. The river gave its name firstly to the town that grew up on its banks from the 13th century, and then to the county that was established in the late 16th and early 17th century.  This name can be traced in ancient annals and other sources attesting to it for over 1,500 years. 

However, by the time of early Ordnance Survey work in the 19th century, the common name had become the Garavogue, at least for the river from Lough Gill to below the bridge in the town of Sligo.

The source of the name Garavogue is uncertain, but may be based on "garbh," meaning "rough" or "gritty." In English it was also sometimes known as the Githy. Another interpretation is that the Garavogue takes its name from the local 'landscape goddess', a hag or witch who is said to have built megaliths in the region by dropping stones, and to have lived on a nearby hill with a mad king named Sweeney.

Course
From Lough Gill, the Garavogue winds through Sligo town and flows into Sligo Bay. The river's estuary continues for roughly  out to Rosses Point. The wide estuary has a shipping channel capable of taking ships up to 10,000 tons, but it is only navigable as far as Sligo town, where there is a port facility. There is also a marina for smaller and pleasure craft.

History
The Garavogue is mentioned in Early Medieval texts as one of the "nine royal rivers" of Ireland.  Saint Patrick is said to have blessed it so that it would produce salmon all year round.

The battle of Sligo (river) took place at this river in 536 AD between Eoghan Bél, King of Connacht and the forces of two branches of the Uí Néill of Ulster.

References

Sligo (town)
Garavogue